The German Antarctic Expedition (1938–1939), led by German Navy captain Alfred Ritscher (1879–1963), was the third official Antarctic expedition of the German Reich, by order of the "Commissioner for the Four-Year Plan" Hermann Göring. Councilor of state Helmuth Wohlthat was mandated with planning and preparation. The expedition's main objective was of economic nature, in particular the establishment of a whaling station and the acquisition of fishing grounds for a German whaling fleet in order to reduce the Reich's dependence on the import of industrial oils, fats and dietary fats. Preparations took place under strict secrecy as the enterprise was also tasked to make a feasibility assessment for a future occupation of Antarctic territory in the region between 20 ° West and 20 ° East.

Preparations 

In July 1938, Captain Alfred Ritscher received a mandate to launch preparations for an Antarctic expedition and within a few months he managed to bring about logistics, equipment and organizational measures for a topographical and marine survey expedition. Whale oil was then the most important raw material for the production of margarine and soap in Germany and the country was the second largest purchaser of Norwegian whale oil, importing some 200,000 tons annually. Dependence on imports and the forthcoming war was considered to put too much strain on Germany's foreign currency reserves. Supported by whaling expert Otto Kraul marine explorations were to be undertaken in order to set up a base for a whaling fleet and aerial photo surveys were to be carried out to map territory.

With only six months available for preparatory work, Ritscher had to rely on the antiquated MS Schwabenland ship and aircraft of Deutsche Lufthansa's Atlantic Service, with which a scientific program along the coast was to be carried out and retrieve biologic, meteorologic, oceanographic and geomagnetic studies. By applying modern aerophotogrammetric methods, Aerial surveys of the unknown Antarctic hinterlands were to be carried out with two Dornier Do J II seaplanes, named Boreas and Passat, that had to be launched via a steam catapult on the MS Schwabenland expedition ship. After urgent repairs on the ship and the two seaplanes, the 33 expedition members plus a crew of 24 on the Schwabenland left Hamburg on December 17, 1938.

Expedition 

The Expedition reached the Princess Martha Coast on January 19, 1939, and was active along the Queen Maud Land coast from 19 January to 15 February 1939. In seven survey flights between January 20 and February 5, 1939, an area of approx.  was photogrammetrically mapped. Previously unknown ice-free mountain ranges, several small ice-free lakes were discovered in the hinterland. The ice-free Schirmacher Oasis, which now hosts the Maitri and Novolazarevskaya research stations, was spotted from the air by Richard Schirmacher (who named it after himself). During an additional eight special flights, in which Ritscher also took part, particularly interesting regions were filmed and taken with color photos. Around 11,600 aerial photographs were taken. Biological investigations were carried out on board the Schwabenland and on the sea ice on the coast. However, the insufficient equipment did not allow sled expeditions to the ice shelf or landings of the flying boats in the mountains. All explorations were carried out without a single member of the expedition having entered the inner territory.

The region between 10 ° W and 15 ° E was named New Swabia (Neuschwabenland) by the expedition leader. In the meantime, the Norwegian government had found out about the German Antarctic activities after the wife of the deputy expedition leader Ernst Herrmann had informed Norwegian geologist Adolf Hoel. On January 14, 1939, the Norwegian government declared the entire sector between 20 ° W and 45 ° E Norwegian territory (Queen Maud Land) without defining its southern extent.

On February 6, 1939, the expedition embarked on its return voyage, left the coast of Antarctica and carried out oceanographic research in the vicinity of Bouvet Island and Fernando de Noronha. At the request of the Navy High Command, crew members landed on the Brazilian island of Trindade on March 18 to check whether submarines could be supplied with fresh water and food without being noticed. The landing crew was shipwrecked in a small bay and had to be rescued. Since the landing had taken place in the strictest secrecy, Ritscher did not include the event in his final printed report. On April 11, 1939, the Schwabenland arrived in Hamburg.

Geographic features mapped by the expedition

As the area was first explored by a German expedition, the name New Swabia and German names given to its geographic features are still used on many maps. Some geographic features mapped by the expedition were not named until the Norwegian-British-Swedish Antarctic Expedition (NBSAE) of 1949–1952, led by John Schjelderup Giæver. Others were only named after they were remapped from aerial photos taken by the Norwegian Antarctic Expedition of 1958–1959.

 Ahlmann Ridge
 Alan Peak
 Aurdalsegga Ridge
 Austvorren Ridge
 Boreas Nunatak
 Borg Massif
 Cape Sedov
 Conrad Mountains
 Dalsnatten Crag
 Drygalski Mountains
 Dvergen Hill
 Dyna Hill
 Filchner Mountains
 Fjellimellom Valley
 Fimbul Ice Shelf
 Gamaleya Rock
 Gessner Peak
 Gburek Peaks
 Gneiskopf Peak
 Gockel Ridge
 Habermehl Peak
 Herrmann Mountains
 Høghamaren Crag
 Horgebest Peak
 Hortebrekka Slope
 Horteflaket Névé
 Humboldt Mountains
 Isdalen Valley
 Isdalsegga Ridge
 Isfossnipa Peak
 Ising Glacier
 Isingsalen Saddle
 Isingufsa Bluff
 Istind Peak
 Kal'vets Rock
 Knut Rocks
 Kraul Mountains
 Kruber Rock
 Kvamsgavlen Cliff
 Kvitkleven Cirque
 Kvitskarvhalsen Saddle
 Låghamaren Cliff
 Lake Untersee
 Luna-Devyat' Mountain
 Mount Dallmann
 Mount Dobrynin
 Mount Krüger
 Mount Neustruyev
 Mount Zimmermann
 Mount Zuckerhut
 Mühlig-Hofmann Mountains
 New Swabia
 Orvin Mountains
 Payer Mountains
 Penck Trough
 Per Rock
 Petermann Ranges
 Preuschoff Range
 Rømlingsletta Flat
 Rindehallet Slope
 Ritscher Peak
 Ritscher Upland
 Saetet Cirque
 Sandeggtind Peak
 Schirmacher Oasis
 Schirmacher Ponds
 Shatskiy Hill
 Sjøbotnen Cirque
 Skaret Pass
 Skeidskar Gap
 Skimten Hill
 Slithallet Slope
 Sørskeidet Valley
 Stabben Mountain
 Steinbotnen Cirque
 Storeidet Col
 Storkvarvet Mountain
 Storsåtklubben Ridge
 Südliche Petermann Range
 Sverdrup Mountains
 Sverre Peak
 Terningen Peak
 Tindeklypa
 Torgny Peak
 Tysk Pass
 Utrista Rock
 Vestskotet Bluff
 Vorposten Peak
 Weyprecht Mountains
 Wohlthat Mountains
 Zhil'naya Mountain
 Zwiesel Mountain

Scientific evaluation 
Until 1942 pioneer geodesist Otto von Gruber produced detailed topographical maps of eastern New Swabia at a scale of 1: 50,000 and an overview map of all explored territories. Among the newly discovered areas were, for example, the Kraul Mountains, named after whaling expert and pilot Otto Kraul. The evaluation of the results in western New Swabia was interrupted by World War II and a large part of the 11,600 oblique aerial photographs were lost during the war. In addition to the images and maps published by Ritscher, only about 1100 aerial photos survived the war, but these were only rediscovered and evaluated in 1982. The results of the biological, geophysical and meteorological investigations were only published after the war between 1954 and 1958. Captain Ritscher did in fact prepare another expedition with improved, lighter aircraft on skids, which however was never carried out due to the outbreak of the Second World War.

Public perception 

As a result of great secrecy and relatively little time for preparation, the enterprise completely escaped any advanced public attention as the MS Schwabenland embarked unnoticed.

The first report of the expedition was telegraphed only during the return journey from Cape Town to Helmut Wohlthat, who published a press release on March 6, 1939. As in Great Britain the Daily Telegraph and in the USA the New York Times reported on the expedition in reference to the Norwegian occupation of the area, only the Hamburg local press took notice of the expedition's return to Germany. On May 25, 1939, the Berliner Illustrirte Zeitung magazine published a small-scale map of the mountains discovered and the flight polygons without authorization by the expedition leader. The map was drawn by the aircraft mechanic Franz Preuschoff and is as such referred to as the "Preuschoff map". This map was incorporated in the 1939 1: 10,000,000 scale map of Antarctica  by Australian cartographer E. P. Bayliss.

A reference to the expedition was posted in the Berlin Zoological Garden in front of the Emperor penguin enclosure. The penguins had been caught by Lufthansa flight captain Rudolf Mayr, flight mechanic Franz Preuschoff and zoologist Erich Barkley and arrived in Cuxhaven on April 12, 1939. The expedition geologist Ernst Herrmann, published the only popular science book for a wider audience for more than 60 years in 1941. Due to the lack of information during the following decades, myths and conspiracy theories eventually developed around the expedition and Neuschwabenland.

Although Germany issued a decree about the establishment of a German Antarctic Sector called New Swabia after the expedition's return in August 1939 no official territorial claims were ever advanced for the region, abandoned in 1945 and never revoked since. No whaling station or other lasting structure was built by Germany until the Georg-von-Neumayer-Station, a research facility, established in 1981. The current Neumayer-Station III is also located in the region.

New Swabia is now a cartographic area of Queen Maud Land which is administered by Norway as a dependent territory under the Antarctic Treaty System by the Polar Affairs Department of the Ministry of Justice and the Police.

See also 

1938–39 German expedition to Tibet
German Amazon-Jary-Expedition (1935-1937)

References

External links
 Photographs of the MS Schwabenland and its seaplanes 
 More photographs of the MS Schwabenland 
 Erich von Drygalski and the 1901–03 German Antarctic Expedition, Scott Polar Research Institute
 Wilhelm Filchner and the 1911–12 German Antarctic Expedition, Scott Polar Research Institute
 Kartographische Arbeiten und deutsche Namengebung in Neuschwabenland, Antarktis

History of Antarctica
Regions of Queen Maud Land
Research and development in Nazi Germany
Germany and the Antarctic
1938 in Antarctica
1939 in Antarctica
1939 establishments in Antarctica
Expeditions from Germany